Two ships of the Royal Navy have been named HMS Heythrop:

  was a  launched in 1917 and sold in 1922.
  was a  launched in 1940 and sunk in 1942.

Royal Navy ship names